Doriopsilla debruini is a species of dorid nudibranch, a colourful sea slug, a shell-less marine gastropod mollusc in the family Dendrodorididae.

Distribution
This species was described from Hout Bay, South Africa.

References

Endemic fauna of South Africa
Dendrodorididae
Gastropods described in 2001